A multifunctional furniture is a furniture with several functions combined. The functions combined may vary, but a common variant is to incorporate an extra storage function into chair, tables, and so forth, making them so-called storage furniture. Multifunctional furniture can accommodate more efficient use of living spaces. Lack of space can be an important reason for choosing such furniture, but combination furniture is also seen in larger homes for more space-efficient utilization. Historically, furniture with transforming mechanisms was called "mechanical furniture".

Examples 
Some common examples of multifunctional furniture are:

 Chair-table, a table where the tabletop can be hinged to form the back of a seat to serve as a chair, if necessary
 Chest-chair, a type of chair where the seat doubles as the lid of a chest for storage
 Chest-table, a chest used as a table, with storage space underneath a hinged tabletop. Today more commonly seen as coffee tables, since persons' legs are not commonly rested underneath such tables.
 Coffee table with extra storage on their underside is a type of multifunctional furniture
 Daybed, a combination furniture which can be used as a bed, for sitting, or for rest and relaxation in common rooms
 Lambing chair, a type of unchair commonly with storage under the seat in form of a drawer
 Monks bench, a table/bench
 Ottoman, a stool where the seat often is hinged with a hollow inside which can be used for storage
 Pull-down bed, a folding bed that is hinged on one end so that it can be stored vertically against a wall or inside a cupboard
 Recliner, a chair which can be folded out to a near supine position for sleeping
 Storage bed, a bed with built in storage
 Sofa bed, a sofa where the seating area can be pulled or folded out to form a bed for sleeping
 Storage bench, a bench where there is storage beneath the seat
 Step chair and onit chair (the latter has an ironing-board mode)

See also 
 Hidden compartment
 :Category:Mechanical furniture
 Modern furniture
 :Category:Portable furniture

Literature 
 Møbler i Norge (1976) by Trond Juul Gjerdi

References

External links 
 "kombinasjonsmøbel" at DigitaltMuseum
 Small spaces need smart solutions - Designing furniture for small spaces, in connection with human wellbeing. Kristoffer Thøgersen, Department of Design, Norwegian University of Science and Technology

Furniture